Gottfried Bär (born 11 April 1952) is an Austrian table tennis player. He competed in the men's doubles event at the 1988 Summer Olympics.

References

1952 births
Living people
Austrian male table tennis players
Olympic table tennis players of Austria
Table tennis players at the 1988 Summer Olympics
Place of birth missing (living people)